Queen Adran is the queen of the Adranika race, a fictional race in Darna created by Filipino comics writer Mars Ravelo.

Character Description 
Queen Adran (another anagram of Darna) was the benevolent queen of the surface-dwelling race called "Adranika" on the Planet Marte. Her rival, Queen Braguda (of the underground-dwelling "Anomalka" race) was her former friend until Braguda vowed to one day conquer the Planet Earth as well as the rest of the universe.

To thwart Braguda's plan, Adran stole the magic white stone of power from Braguda. Without the white stone, Braguda would be unable to conquer the rest of the universe. To help prevent Braguda from ever reclaiming it, Queen Adran sent her confidant Aio to the planet Earth to find a worthy host for the white stone's power. Right after Aio leaves the Planet Marte for the Earth, Marte is destroyed as well as Queen Adran along with it.

It is later discovered that there are other Adranikans who survived but unfortunately, Queen Adran is not one of them.

In other media 
In the 2005 television series of Darna by GMA Network, Queen Adran is played by veteran Filipina actress Lorna Tolentino who also played Darna/Narda in the 1977 Darna the TV Series on KBS-9 in which Darna donned a one-piece instead of the usual bikini for the first time.

In the 2022 television series of Darna by the Kapamilya Channel, Queen Adran is Queen Kevnar who was played by Miss Universe Philippines 2022 Celeste Cortesi.

See also
 Darna
 Darna (2005 TV Series)

References

External links

Mars Ravelo Superheroes web site
Darna at the International Catalogue of Superheroes
Darna 2005 TV series

Darna
Fictional queens
Extraterrestrial characters in comics